The Battle of Beneventum may refer to one of two battles:

The Battle of Beneventum (275 BC), an inconclusive battle fought between Pyrrhus of Epirus and Manius Curius Dentatus during the Pyrrhic War.
The Battle of Beneventum (214 BC), a battle fought between Hanno and Tiberius Gracchus during the Second Punic War and a Roman victory.
The Battle of Beneventum (212 BC)

See also
 Battle of Benevento (AD 1266)